Testosterone glucuronide is an endogenous, naturally occurring steroid and minor urinary metabolite of testosterone.

See also
 Androstanediol glucuronide
 Androsterone glucuronide
 Etiocholanolone glucuronide
 Testosterone sulfate

References

Testosterone
Glucuronide esters
Human metabolites